P. S. Sreedharan Pillai (born 1 December 1954) is an Indian politician, attorney, and author, who is currently serving as the 19th and current Governor of Goa since 2021. He  also served as the Governor of Mizoram from 2019 to 2021, he was also the Bharatiya Janata Party president of Kerala state from 2003 to 2006 and again from 2018 to 2019.

Political career
Pillai started his political career through the Akhila Bharatiya Vidyarthi Parishad (ABVP), the student wing of the Bharatiya Janata Party. He was a state secretary of the ABVP during his college days. He has served in many posts in the BJP, including Kozhikode district president, state secretary, and general secretary. He was elected as BJP State President of Bharatiya Janata Party (BJP) in Kerala from 2003 to 2006 and also served as the BJP Prabhari of Lakshadweep UT in 2004. Under his leadership, in 2004, the National Democratic Alliance won two MP seats from Kerala (P. C. Thomas, Indian Federal Democratic Party) and Lakshadweep (P. Pookunhi Koya, Janata Dal (United)). In 2018, he was again appointed the state President, preceding Kummanam Rajasekharan. He was appointed Governor of Mizoram on 25 October 2019.

Literary career
Sreedharan Pillai took to writing nearly four decades ago, publishing his first book in 1983. He has published more than 165+ books.

Bibliography

Anthologies

 Kaaladanam (2005)
 Bonsai (2008)
 Pazhassismriti
 Novum Naliavutti
 Udakumbham
 Marmarangal
 Avinaabhavam
 Spadika Manikal
 Mandarangal
 Aduthoon
 Oh Mizoram (Malayalam)
 Oh Mizoram (English)
 Corona Kavithakal
 Lockdown Kavithakal

Folklore Poems
 Anchadi Thottangal
 Neerthullikal
 Nadan Mathuram
 Padheyam
 Nadan Pattukal

History
 Punnapra Vayalar – Kanappurangal
 Adiyanthravastha Oru Ormapeduthal
 Vibhajanathinte Noottandu
 Mohajir – Desiyathayum Vikadanasakhthikalum 
 Rashtranayakar
 Dark Days of Democracy (English)
 Adiyanthravastha Iruttinte Nilavilikal

Legal
 Niyamavrithaandam
 Shah Banu Begum case (English)
 Five Judgements for Common Man (English)
 UAPA Niyamathekurich
 Ghargika peedanathilninnuolla shrisamprashana 
 Niyama Veedhiyiloode
 Domestic Violence (English)
 Protection of Children from Sexual Offences (English)
 Shah Commission on Emergency (English)
 Neethi Thedunna Kuttavum Sikshayum
 Niyama Visesham
 Pothu Civil Code Enthu Enthinu?
 Bharnaghatana – Punaravlokanathinte Pathayil
 Hand Book of Mental laws (English)
 Law and Psychiatry (English)
 Vakkil Diary
 Niyamavum Neethiyum
 Niyama Lekhanangal
 Kesavananda Bharati Case
 Triple Talaq (English)
 Best Bakery Case (English)
 Great Debate of Trio (English)
 Shishu samprashana niyamavum chattagalum
 Italy CharaKessu
 Ruling on Death Sentence (English)
 Ruling on Medical Negligence (English)

Politics
 Advani havalakesh sathiyavum mithiyum
 Sathyavangmoolam
 Rashtreeya Lekhannagal
 Rajanaithikam
 Rashtreeya Diary
 Congress Fascism PennHitlerum
 Oru Facebook
 Pukamarayillathe
 Palavaka
 Samasya
 Pakshabhedamillathe
 Vyadhayum Veedshanavum
 Rashtreeyathiloode
 Ezhuthu
 Utharam Thedumbol
 Current affairs (English)

Economy
 Sambathika Rangavum Kupracharanavum
 Sambathika Kazhichakal
 Note pinvalikkalum dhanarangavum
 Dhanarangam Vilayiruthumbol
 GST enna swapna shashathkaram
 Sambathika sudheekaranavum surgical strikum
 Currency rathakkalum sampathvevashthayum
 Sampathika nettagalliluda

Saamskarikam
 Nermurikal
 Saphalyam Thedunna Swathanthriyam
 Bharatheeyam
 Raman, Gandhi, Bharatheeyatha
 Nostradamus
 Matham, Rashtreeyam, Deseeyodgradhanam
 Kakshiyude Veshathil
 Five Important Speeches (English)
 Republic Day 2020 (English)
 Thus speaks the Governor (English)
 Innathe Vishayangal
 Straight Line (English)
 Justice for all, Prejudice to none (English)
 Harmonial Talk (English)
 Governor on Social Harmony (English)
 Rent Control Laws (English)
 Lushayi Kunnukal
 Nerkazyicha
 Samukika Samarasatha
 Right of Privacy (English)

Travelogue
 Lakshadeep enna marathaka depu

Stories/Humor
 Chiriyum Chinthayum Karutha Kottil (Yet to Publish)
 Mizo Kathakal
 Thatha Varathirikkilla

Jeevitha Rekhakal (Milestones)
 Kazhichakal Kazhichapadukal
 Madela muthal Azhiikoduvare
 Prathibhakal, Prathibhasangal
 Chessinte Kuthippum Kurukkum
 Ormayile Veerendra Kumar
 Thathsamaya Chinthakal

Social
 Vilakkukalukal Evide?
 Karya Vicharam
 Dholakam
 Thuranna Kathukal
 Information Technologiyum Vyakulathkalum
 Varthamana Kurippukal
 Madhyama Kazhichapadukal
 Manushyavakashangal Innu

Collection of Articles
 Address on Goa Assembly (English)
 Parivarthanathinte Pathayiloode
 Sakhyam
 Nerinte Nerma
 Onchiyam Oru Marana Warrant
 Neethiyude Rashtreeyam
 Samakaalikam
 The Other View (English)
 Irakalum Prathikalum
 Nettil Kurungunna Malayali
 Vadhasiksha: Ariyendathum Ariyikkendathum
 Thudippukal
 Ner Rekhakal
 Neethiyude Thathwasastram
 Baluch – Mohajir Prashanagalum Pakisthanum

Literature
 Sahithya Chinthakal
 Nireekshanangal, Nilapadukal
 Madhyamangal Vilayiruthumbol
 Prathibhakaliloode
 Vashikaattikal
 Goa Vimochanavum Malayalikalum
 Thuranna Manasoday
 Moonnu Mahatmakal
 Mizhi Thurkkumpol
 Keynote of the Governor (English)
 Ezhuthinntte Vazhikal
 Muka Kurupukal
 Chimbai
 Proclamation by President Article 356 (English)
 Akashaveethiyiloode
 Lushayil ninnum Dona Pauleilekku
 Olliminnum Ormakalilooda October
 Goa Via Mizoram (English)
 30 days of Mission Humanity (English)
 Governor addresses Goa (English)
 Kathayalla Kathakal (Yet to Publish)
 My One year in Goa (Coffee table book) (Yet to Publish)
 Convocation Speeches (Yet to Publish)
 Mukapusthaka Kurupukal (Yet to Publish)
 My visits to Goan villages (Yet to Publish)
 Justice Annachandy (Yet to Publish)
 Sreeranthangal (Yet to Publish)
 Dashinenthiyan Shetharagalilooda (Yet to Publish)
 Meet the press (Yet to Publish)
 Gujarat Vidhi (Yet to Publish)
 Nammudea Bharanakadana (Yet to Publish)
 Canacona Village (Yet to Publish)
 Ponda Village (Yet to Publish)
 Ayodhya Verdict (Yet to Publish)

Personal life 

Pillai married Advocate K. Rita at Kozhikode in 1984, who is a practicing lawyer at the District Court Kozhikode. His son Arjun Sreedhar is a lawyer at the High Court of Kerala and started the profession as Junior to his father. His daughter-in-law Jipsa Arjun is a post-graduate in pediatric dentistry and is practicing at Calicut. His daughter Arya Arun is a post-graduate in Dental Science and is practicing in Cochin, while her husband Arun Krishna Dhan is also a lawyer in the High Court of Kerala and started his career as a junior to his father-in-law.

References

|-

External links
 

People from Alappuzha district
Living people
Malayali politicians
Kerala politicians
Bharatiya Janata Party politicians from Kerala
Activists from Kerala
1954 births
Governors of Mizoram
Governors of Goa